Olanrewaju "Lanre" Kehinde (born 7 May 1994) is a Nigerian footballer.

Career

Club
Kehinde's career started in Nigeria with Dominion Hotspur, who he joined Kwara United on loan from in 2011 before leaving in 2012 to join Israeli Premier League side Maccabi Tel Aviv. He didn't make a first-team appearance for Maccabi, but was loaned out twice to Liga Leumit clubs. Firstly to Hakoah Amidar Ramat Gan for the 2013–14 season and secondly to Hapoel Afula for the following season, 2014–15. In total, Kehinde scored 28 goals in 60 appearances across the two loan spells. He left Maccabi permanently in 2015 and subsequently had spells with Premier League teams Hapoel Kfar Saba and Hapoel Acre.

In July 2016, Kehinde joined UAE First Division League club Al-Fujairah. After six months in the United Arab Emirates, Kehinde left to join TFF First League side Elazığspor on loan.

International
Kehinde has represented Nigeria at U17 and U18 level, making an appearance apiece.

References

External links
 

1994 births
Living people
Nigerian footballers
Sportspeople from Lagos
Nigeria youth international footballers
Association football forwards
Kwara United F.C. players
Maccabi Tel Aviv F.C. players
Hakoah Maccabi Amidar Ramat Gan F.C. players
Hapoel Afula F.C. players
Hapoel Kfar Saba F.C. players
Hapoel Acre F.C. players
Fujairah FC players
Elazığspor footballers
MKE Ankaragücü footballers
Denizlispor footballers
Incheon United FC players
Ümraniyespor footballers
Menemenspor footballers
Hapoel Nof HaGalil F.C. players
Israeli Premier League players
Liga Leumit players
TFF First League players
Süper Lig players
K League 1 players
Nigerian expatriate footballers
Expatriate footballers in Israel
Expatriate footballers in the United Arab Emirates
Expatriate footballers in Turkey
Expatriate footballers in South Korea
Nigerian expatriate sportspeople in Israel
Nigerian expatriate sportspeople in the United Arab Emirates
Nigerian expatriate sportspeople in Turkey
Nigerian expatriate sportspeople in South Korea